Nuzéjouls is a commune in the Lot department in south-western France.

Toponymy
Nuzejouls is derived from the Latin nux, nucis and the gaulish for "clearing".

Tourism
During the 1990s, the village was a center of camel breeding, which attracted many tourists at a regional level.

References

See also
Communes of the Lot department

Communes of Lot (department)